Eupodidae is a family  in the order Trombidiformes. There are at least two genera and three described species in Eupodidae.

Genera
 Claveupodes
 Eupodes

References

Further reading

 
 
 
 

Trombidiformes
Acari families